The Association of IOC Recognised International Sports Federations (ARISF) is a non-governmental, non-profit organisation constituted through and recognised by the International Olympic Committee (IOC). The ARISF's members are international sports federations recognised by the IOC that currently do not compete in either the Summer or Winter Olympics. Becoming a member of this organization does not imply or guarantee that the sport  will be included in future Olympic games.

Among the aims of ARISF are: act as a spokesperson to defend and coordinate the common interests of its members whilst maintaining their authority, independence and autonomy, determine the consensus of the member federations on questions of common interest in relation to the Olympic Movement and ensure the largest possible participation in the activities of the IOC.

Headquartered in the Swiss city of Lausanne, it was formed in 1983. It is headed by Raffaele Chiulli, who is the President of ARISF.

ARISF Council 
The Council is composed of a President, Vice-President, Secretary General and three members, all from different sports federations.

Members 
The following 42 governing bodies are members of the ARISF. The p in between the date means provisional recognition while the date alone means full recognition.

Former members

See also 

 International Olympic Committee (IOC)
 Association of Summer Olympic International Federations (ASOIF)
 Association of International Olympic Winter Sports Federations (AIOWF)
 Global Association of International Sports Federations (GAISF)
 List of international sports federations

Notes and references

External links 
 
 International Olympic Committee - ARISF

 Association of IOC Recognised International Sports Federations
International Olympic Committee
Sports organizations established in 1983
Olympic organizations